Chrisitine Mukabunani is a Rwandan politician a member of parliament in Rwanda. she was a chairperson of the Social Party IMBERAKURI.

Political career 
Christine serving as a member of parliament in Rwanda since 2018, she participated in training programmer on the political empowerment of women, she was a chairperson of the Social Party IMBERAKURI. and they used to be in the General Assembly of the national Consultative forum of Political Organizations (NFPO).

References

Rwandan politicians
Year of birth missing (living people)
Living people